This is a list of places on the Victorian Heritage Register in the City of Whitehorse in Victoria, Australia. The Victorian Heritage Register is maintained by the Heritage Council of Victoria.

The Victorian Heritage Register, as of 2020, lists the following 10 state-registered places within the City of Whitehorse:

References

Whitehorse
City of Whitehorse